Natália Silva (15 September 1927 - c.1958) was a Portuguese gymnast. She competed in five events at the 1952 Summer Olympics.

She was killed in a car accident, along with her husband and son, at the age of 31.

References

External links
 

1927 births
1950s deaths
Portuguese female artistic gymnasts
Olympic gymnasts of Portugal
Gymnasts at the 1952 Summer Olympics
Place of birth missing
20th-century Portuguese women